Adlavik Islands is a set of islands on the coast of Labrador, northwest on Cape Harrisson. It may have been called Adnavik and a port of call as early as 1911.

See also
 List of ghost towns in Newfoundland and Labrador

References

Islands of Newfoundland and Labrador